Give Me the Night is a 1980 album by American jazz guitarist and singer George Benson.

Producer Quincy Jones released the album on his start-up label Qwest Records, in conjunction with Warner Bros. Records.

Reception

Give Me the Night charted at number one on both the Top Soul Albums and Jazz Albums charts, as well as number three on the Billboard Pop Albums charts, later certified Platinum by the RIAA. 

The album's success was closely associated with its title track lead single, which rose to the top spot on the Soul Singles chart. 

The album earned Benson three wins at the 1981 Grammy Awards, including Best Male R&B Vocal Performance, while "Moody's Mood" received Best Jazz Vocal Performance, Male and "Off Broadway" received Best R&B Instrumental Performance. Quincy Jones and Jerry Hey also won the Grammy Award for Best Instrumental Arrangement for "Dinorah, Dinorah."

Track listing
Side one
 "Love X Love" (Rod Temperton) – 4:45
 "Off Broadway" (Temperton) – 5:23
 "Moody's Mood" (Eddie Jefferson, James Moody) – 3:24 (featuring Patti Austin)
 "Give Me the Night" (Temperton) – 5:01

Side two
 "What's on Your Mind" (Glen Ballard, Kerry Chater) – 4:02
 "Dinorah, Dinorah" (Ivan Lins, Vitor Martins) – 3:39
 "Love Dance" (Ivan Lins, Gilson Peranzzetta, Paul Williams) – 3:18
 "Star of a Story (X)" (Temperton) – 4:42 (*)
 "Midnight Love Affair" (David "Hawk" Wolinski) – 3:31
 "Turn Out the Lamplight" (Temperton) – 4:43 (**)

(*) Originally recorded in 1978 as "The Star of a Story" by Heatwave, of which Temperton was a member.

(**) Originally recorded in 1976 by Heatwave, of which Temperton was a member.

Personnel 
Musicians

 George Benson – lead vocals, backing vocals (1, 3–5, 7–10), guitar (1–5, 8–10), lead guitar (6), scat (6)
 Greg Phillinganes – keyboards (1–3, 10), synthesizers (2, 3), Fender Rhodes (6)
 Michael Boddicker – synthesizers (4, 5, 8)
 Herbie Hancock – electric piano (4), synthesizers (6, 7, 9), synthesizer programming (6, 8, 9), Fender Rhodes (7, 8)
 Richard Tee – synthesizer bass (4), electric piano (5), synthesizers (8–10)
 Clare Fischer – Yamaha CS30 (6), acoustic piano (6), Fender Rhodes (6)
 George Duke – keyboards (9)
 Lee Ritenour – guitar (2, 4, 5, 8, 9), acoustic guitar (7), electric guitar (10)
 Louis Johnson – bass guitar (1, 2, 6, 10)
 Abraham Laboriel – bass guitar (1, 3–5, 7, 8)
 John Robinson – drums (1–6, 8, 10)
 Carlos Vega – drums (7, 9)
 Paulinho da Costa – percussion (1, 2, 4, 5–8, 10)
 Kim Hutchcroft – saxophones (1, 2, 4–6, 9), flute (1, 2, 4–6, 9)
 Larry Williams – saxophones (1, 2, 4–6, 9), flute (1, 2, 4–6, 9)
 Jerry Hey – trumpet (1, 2, 4–6, 9)
 Sid Sharp – concertmaster (1–6, 8)
 Patti Austin – backing vocals (1, 4, 6, 8, 10), lead vocals (3)
 Tom Bahler – backing vocals (1, 4, 8, 10)
 Jocelyn Brown – backing vocals (1, 4, 8)
 Jim Gilstrap – backing vocals (1, 4, 8)
 Diva Gray – backing vocals (1, 4, 8)

Technical

 Quincy Jones – producer, liner notes, rhythm arrangements (2–10), vocal arrangements (5, 8, 9), synthesizer arrangements (8)
 Lee Ritenour – rhythm arrangements (7)
 Jerry Hey – horn arrangements (1, 2, 4–6, 9), string arrangements (1, 2, 4–6)
 David Foster – string arrangements (1, 9)
 Rod Temperton – rhythm arrangements (2, 4), vocal arrangements (4)
 Marty Paich – string arrangements, conductor (3, 8)
 Tom Bahler – background vocal arrangements (10)
 Bruce Swedien – engineer, mixing
 Sheridan Eldridge – assistant engineer
 Ralph Osbourne – assistant engineer
 Mark Sackett – assistant engineer
 Jim Sintetos – mastering
 Kent Duncan – mastering
 Richard Seireeni – art direction
 Paul Jasmin – illustration
 Norman Seeff – cover photography
 Peter Brill – sleeve photography
 Anderson Typographics – typography

Charts

Weekly charts

Year-end charts

Certifications

External links
 George Benson-Give Me The Night at Discogs

References

1980 albums
George Benson albums
Warner Records albums
Albums arranged by Quincy Jones
Albums produced by Quincy Jones